Aubin is a commune in the Pyrénées-Atlantiques department in the Nouvelle-Aquitaine region of south-western France.

Geography
Aubin is located some 35 km east by south-east of Orthez and 20 km north of Pau. The A65 autoroute passes through the commune but there is no exit in or near the commune with the nearest exit being Exit 9 south of Lalonquette or the beginning of the motorway just north of Lescar. Access to the commune is by the D210 road from Bournos in the east which goes to the village. The D216 from Sauvagnon in the south-east passes through the south of the commune on its way to Momas in the north-west. Country roads are also available to access the commune. There are some scattered forests in the commune but most of it is farmland.

The Luy de Béarn forms the south-western border of the commune as it flows north-west to join the Luy de France near Vieux-Bourg to become the Luy. The Aubiosse river flows through the south of the commune from east to west and joins the Luy de Béarn south-west of the commune. The Gez river forms the north-eastern border of the commune as it flows north-west to join the Luy de Béarn.

Places and hamlets

 Baradat
 Bas
 Bousquet
 Brunet
 Cabet
 Cambatu
 Carou
 Castet-Bieilh
 Cazaux (ruins)
 Combatu
 Dufau
 Guichot
 Lacoste
 Lafitte
 Larquier
 Lasalle
 Loulet
 Loustau
 Maribat
 Maupas
 Maysounave
 Plaisance
 Le Pouthiau
 Prué
 Soubette
 Tournemouly
 Turon

Neighbouring communes and villages

Toponymy
The commune name in béarnais is Aubin. Michel Grosclaude proposed an etymology of the Latin man's name Albius with the suffix -inum (Albinum), the whole meaning "Domain of Albius".

The following table details the origins of the commune name:

Sources:

Raymond: Topographic Dictionary of the Department of Basses-Pyrenees, 1863, on the page numbers indicated in the table. 
Grosclaude: Toponymic Dictionary of communes, Béarn, 2006 

Origins:
Lescar: Cartulary of Lescar
Fors de Béarn
Census: Census of Béarn

History
The village is first mentioned in 1101 as Sanctus-Genumer-de-Albii.  At the start of the 11th century, the village and its church were given to the Bishop of Lescar by the wife of Viscount Centulle III.

Paul Raymond noted on page 16 of the 1863 dictionary that in 1385 Aubin had 17 fires and depended on the bailiwick of Pau. Bournos was also annexed to the parish of Aubin, the former archpriest of the Diocese of Lescar.

Administration

List of Successive Mayors

Inter-communality
The commune is part of four inter-communal structures:
 the Communauté de communes des Luys en Béarn;
 the Energy association of Pyrénées-Atlantiques;
 the inter-communal association for the management of drinking water for Luy - Gabas -Lées;
 the inter-communal association of Aubin-Doumy-Bournos.

Demography
In 2017 the commune had 239 inhabitants.

Culture and heritage

Civil heritage
The commune has a number of buildings and structures that are registered as historical monuments:
A Farmhouse at Cambatu (17th century)
Houses and Farms (17th century)
A Fortified Complex named Castetbielh ("Old Castle") (High Middle Ages) - https://web.archive.org/web/20170205013449/http://visites.aquitaine.fr/ensemble-fortifie-castetbielh

Religious heritage

The commune has a church that is registered as a historical monument:
The Parish Church of Saint Germain-d'Auxerre (12th century). The Church contains many items that are registered as historical objects, some of which were destroyed when the church was renovated in 1981:
Furniture in the Church
Furniture in the Church (Supplementary list)
A Mural Painting (1897) (Destroyed in 1981).
A Lectern (18th century)
A Pulpit (1897)
A Confessional (18th century)
An Altar, Altar seating, Tabernacle, statue, 4 Altar candlesticks (17th century)
An Altar, 2 rows of Altar seating, Tabernacle, 4 Altar candlesticks, Altar Cross (19th century) (All destroyed in 1981)
5 Hilarri (1859)

Facilities
Aubin has a primary school which is shared with Bournos, Auga, and Doumy as an inter-communal educational grouping.

See also
Communes of the Pyrénées-Atlantiques department

External links
Community of communes of Luys en Béarn website 
Aubin on Géoportail, National Geographic Institute (IGN) website 
Aubin on the 1750 Cassini Map

References

Communes of Pyrénées-Atlantiques